Helene von Mülinen (27 November 1850 – 11 March 1924) was a Swiss feminist who is regarded as the founder of the organised Swiss women's suffrage movement. She founded the Swiss women's suffrage movement, Bund Schweizerischer Frauenvereine (BSF), in 1900, and served as its first president between 1900 and 1904.

Biography
Mülinen was born in  Bern, Switzerland on 27 November 1850. Her family were part of the Swiss nobility. Although her parents prevented her from receiving a formal theological degree, von Mülinen audited lectures at the University of Bern including lectures by Adolf Schlatter and Fritz Barth.

In 1890 Mülinen was hospitalized for treatment for tuberculosis. There she became acquainted with the medical student Emma Pieczynska-Reichenbach. The two became life-long partners, committed to the women's movement. 

Mülinen participated in the formation of the Bund Schweizerischer Frauenvereine (Federation of Swiss Women's Associations) and served as its president from 1900 through 1904. She also remained on the board through 1920.

Mülinen died on 11 March 1924 in Bern.

See also
List of suffragists and suffragettes
Women's suffrage in Switzerland

Notes

1850 births
1924 deaths
Swiss suffragists
Swiss feminists
Swiss nobility
Swiss LGBT people